Pedro Camilo Franco Ulloa (born 23 April 1991) is a Colombian professional footballer who plays as a centre back for Fortaleza CEIF. He is frequently used as a playmaker from the defensive end and also as a defensive midfielder if needed. He is mostly known for his anticipation of the ball, ball technique and passing.

Club career

Millonarios
Franco is a youth product of Colombian team Millonarios. After making his debut in 2009 with the senior squad, he became a key defender for the Colombian capital's team. He was part of the team that won the 2012 Categoría Primera A season leading to the final on penalties, where he scored one of the penalties in victory.

In April 2013, Franco reached a remarkable 100th club career appearance.

Beşiktaş
In June 2013, Franco signed a 5-year deal with Turkish giants Beşiktaş for a fee of €2.4 million. However, he did not play in any games for the Turkish side for several months, leading many to believe that would leave in the 2014 January transfer window. With no appearances in the league, Franco requested more playing time in order for potential spot in 2014 World Cup with Colombia. Beşiktaş coach, Slaven Bilić, promised to help him also guaranteeing that Franco would be included in Colombia's final list for the World Cup.

After months of struggling to earn his debut, Franco finally made his official first appearance for the club in 2014 after being subbed in against Trabzonspor in the 66th minute. The game ended 1-1. On February 11, 2014, he scored his first goal for Beşiktaş in a 3–0 away win against Kasımpaşa.

Return to Millonarios
After a mostly unsuccessful loan spell at San Lorenzo, in mid 2016 Franco returns to his hometown team Millonarios.

International career

Franco played with the U-20 national team between 2009 and 2011. He won the 2011 edition of the Toulon Tournament where he was selected as the tournament's best defender, and played in the 2011 South American Youth Championship. He also represented Colombia during the 2011 FIFA U-20 World Cup in which his home nation hosted.

3 years after last playing for Colombia's youth national team, he was called up to the senior squad for the friendlies against Canada and El Salvador. He debuted in a 3–0 win over El Salvador on 10 October, playing a full 90 minutes.

Honours

Club
Millonarios F.C.
Categoría Primera A: 2012-II
Copa Colombia: 2011

Beşiktaş J.K.
Süper Lig: 2015–16

América de Cali
Categoría Primera A: 2019-II
Categoría Primera A: 2020

International
Colombia U20
Toulon Tournament: 2011

Individual
 South American Youth Football Championship Best Player: 2011

References

External links
 
 

1991 births
Living people
Footballers from Bogotá
Colombian footballers
Millonarios F.C. players
Beşiktaş J.K. footballers
San Lorenzo de Almagro footballers
Boluspor footballers
América de Cali footballers
Club Blooming players
Fortaleza C.E.I.F. footballers
Categoría Primera A players
Categoría Primera B players
Süper Lig players
TFF First League players
Argentine Primera División players
Bolivian Primera División players
Colombian expatriate sportspeople in Turkey
Expatriate footballers in Turkey
Colombian expatriate sportspeople in Argentina
Expatriate footballers in Argentina
Colombian expatriate sportspeople in Bolivia
Expatriate footballers in Bolivia
Colombian expatriate footballers
Association football central defenders
Colombia youth international footballers
Colombia under-20 international footballers
Colombia international footballers
2015 Copa América players